Francis Pott may refer to:

 Francis Lister Hawks Pott (1864–1947), president of St. John's University, Shanghai
 Francis Pott (hymnwriter) (1832–1909), clergyman and author of Christian hymns
 Francis Pott (composer) (born 1957), British composer

See also
 Francis Potter (1594–1678), English painter, clergyman, Biblical commentator, and experimentalist